"Waiting for the Worms" (working title "Follow the Worms") is a song from the 1979 Pink Floyd album The Wall. It is preceded by "Run Like Hell" and followed by "Stop".

Composition and plot
At this point in the album, protagonist Pink has lost hope ("You cannot reach me now") and his thinking has decayed, bringing to mind the "worms". In his hallucination, he is a fascist dictator, fomenting racist outrage and violence, as begun in the preceding song, "Run Like Hell".
The count-in is  —German for "one, two, three, all". In the beginning and end the crowd chants, "Hammer", a recurring representation of fascism and violence in The Wall.

The song is a slow, leaden march in G Major, begun with David Gilmour and Roger Waters alternating calm and strident voices, respectively. Waters takes over with an extended vamp on A minor, musically similar to the album's earlier "The Happiest Days of Our Lives". Through a megaphone, he barks forceful invectives ("Waiting to put on a black shirt ... for the queens and the coons and the Reds and the Jews"). After an extended rant, Gilmour's calmer voice returns, with the promise that his followers will "see Britannia rule again" and "send our coloured cousins home again," with Waters concluding "All you need to do is follow the worms!"

Finally, the song changes into a minor-key musical theme: root, major second, minor third, major second—that has recurred throughout the album, as the main theme to "Another Brick in the Wall", the instrumental section of "Hey You", and will be heard in the album's climax, "The Trial". The riff is repeated in E minor, with E minor and D Major chords played atop it on keyboards. From the megaphone, Waters's rant lapses into incomprehensibility, while the music and the crowd's chanting grows louder. Finally, the song abruptly halts with a shout of "Stop!"

Film version
The imagery features a live action segment with some teenagers (the same ones from "In the Flesh?") trampling over a rag doll replica of Pink. He then shouts through a megaphone while his followers march through the street. Following the images of the fascist crowd, the screaming face and the fascist bashing a man's skull from "What Shall We Do Now?", a dog biting meat off a hook then consumed by a larger one (from the Animals tour), and the famous goose-stepping hammer sequence, we see Pink yell "Stop".

Concerts
In the concerts of The Wall, a member of Pink Floyd, often Waters, would wear a leather trenchcoat. Gilmour would provide the high pitched "Ooooh, you cannot reach me now, ooooooh!" The song would build up until the lights extinguish in preparation to introduce the "Pink puppet" that sings "Stop". The marching hammers animation would be displayed on a circular screen above the stage during concerts.

Later concerts, performed by Waters after his departure from the band, featured a similar scene. Backing singers provided Gilmour's lines, and, in the 2010-2013 tour of The Wall, ending with the marching hammers filling the entire wall.

Animation
The full, uncut animation shown at the concert begins with a cartoon image of a hill. On top of the hill are indistinct objects, moving. Suddenly, as the guitar leitmotif plays briefly, the sky goes dark grey, a symbol of evil. The scene scrolls down to reveal London being enveloped in darkness as "Would you like to see..." and the rest of the verse is sung. Then, an abandoned tricycle is shown, as "Would you like to send..." and the rest of that verse is sung. An abandoned playground is shown as the final verse is sung. Then a viaduct appears, where something is goose-stepping. At long last it is revealed that the objects on the hill, what possibly scared the children and what was under the viaduct, are marching hammers. As the fascist dictator shows increasing desperation, louder and angrier, there is a whip pan in to the hammers, and as the camera pans there is a sudden, loud, abrupt instrumental sound, which is quickly replaced by a piano. The animation stops, as the song "Stop" begins.

Reaction
 Jorge Sacido Romero and Luis Miguel Varela Cabo opined that "Waiting for the Worms" represented Waters' fears of a "potential ideological drift towards an ultranationalist, imperialist and racist stand that calls for the resurrection of a Britannia that is both pure and almighty."
 In 2010, Dublin band Twinkranes covered the song for a Mojo magazine tribute album.

Personnel
Roger Waters – EMS VCS 3, lead and backing vocals, megaphone vocals
David Gilmour – lead vocals, backing vocals (intro), laughter, guitars, bass guitar, Prophet-5 synthesiser
Nick Mason – drums
Richard Wright – organ

with:
Bob Ezrin – piano, backing vocals
Bruce Johnston – backing vocals
Toni Tennille – backing vocals
Joe Chemay – backing vocals
Stan Farber – backing vocals
Jim Haas – backing vocals
John Joyce – backing vocals

Further reading

References

External links
 Wall Interview — Jim Ladd (Waiting For The Worms)

Pink Floyd songs
1979 songs
Hard rock ballads
Songs about drugs
Songs against racism and xenophobia
Antisemitism in fiction
Songs written by Roger Waters
Song recordings produced by Bob Ezrin
Song recordings produced by David Gilmour
Song recordings produced by Roger Waters